Paathasala is a 2014 Indian Telugu-language film written and directed by Mahi V Raghav. The original score & soundtrack of the movie are composed by Rahul Raj. The film released on 10 October 2014.

Plot 
Five friends: Raju, Sandhya, Surya, and Salma, who have just completed their engineering are at crossroads about their career choices. Also, they realize that the moment has come to leave each other and move into the big, bad world. So, they decide to take one final road trip to each other’s house.

They hire a swanky van, and start their fun filled journey to these villages. On their route, they discover a lot of things they did not know about each other. They also realize what they want to do with their lives. Rest of the story is as to what happens during their visit, and how the harsh realities change their lives upside down. In short, the film is about how the road trip becomes a Paathasala of sorts and prepares them for the big journey called life.

Cast 

 Nandu as Raju
 Sai Ronak as Adi
 Hamood as Surya
 Anupriya Goenka as Sandhya 
 Sirisha Vanka as Salma
 Sanjay Reddy as Sandhya's father
 Surya as College Principal
 Krishna Bhagavaan as JC Astrologer
 L. B. Sriram as Fat Boy's  father
 Narasimha Raju as Surya's father
 Shashank as Karthik (Special Appearance)

Production

Soundtrack
All music is composed, arranged and produced by Rahul Raj. The soundtrack CD featuring a total of five songs and twelve background score excerpts released on 28 July 2014.

The songs were received well, but it was the background score that was unanimously praised by all reviewers, as a major plus point, crediting it to have elevated the movie to a different level.

 
The soundtrack CD of Paathasala features 5 original songs and 12 background scores excerpts composed, arranged and produced by Rahul Raj.

Soundtrack

Release

Reception
The movie released on 10 October 2014 and met with predominantly positive reviews. A review on International Business Times quoted "Audience Call it New-Age Tollywood Movie. Raghav's interesting concept, lead actors' performances, Rahul Raj's music, Sudheer Surendran's cinematography and its exotic locales are the main highlights of the film, according to viewers.". 123telugu.com said "First half of the film is entertaining, and showcases the fun elements in student life. Locations showcased and production values in the film are stunning. One dance episode featuring a poor kid, has been executed quite emotionally. Paathasala is also a brilliant film technically. Camerawork is quite stunning, as each and every visual looks top notch. Music is decent, and goes with the mood of the film. But it is Rahul Raj’s absorbing background score, that takes the film to a decent level. Dialogues are written in a simple way, and will connect to the youth well."

Awards and nominations

References 

2014 films
Films shot in Telangana
2010s Telugu-language films
Films set in Andhra Pradesh
Films shot in Andhra Pradesh
Films scored by Rahul Raj
Indian drama road movies
Indian drama films
2014 drama films
Films about friendship
Films directed by Mahi V Raghav